St. Mary of the Woods Catholic Church is a parish in the Archdiocese of Chicago located at 7033 North Moselle Avenue in the Edgebrook neighborhood of Chicago, Illinois. Established in 1952 when a group of Catholic women in the neighborhood began a door-to-door petitioning for a new parish in the aftermath of their children missing many school days at the far distance Queen of All Saints Basilica due to the inability of school buses to get through the snow. The petitions were submitted to Cardinal Samuel Stritch in March 1952, and by June, Father Daniel O'Rourke was appointed pastor of the, then unnamed, parish. A storefront on Touhy Avenue was the temporary location for Sunday Mass. The women of the parish's Altar & Rosary Society promptly set to work work raising money at card parties, bake sales and book fairs. By February 1953, the excavation had begun on the current site of the church and school.

Parish School 
The St. Mary of the Woods parish school educates children in the grades from pre-school to the 8th grade.

List of St. Mary of the Woods Pastors
Monsignor Daniel B. O'Rourke (1952-1977)
Father Andrew J. McDonagh (1977-1988) 
Monsignor Leo T. Mahon (1988-1997)
Father Gregory Sakowicz (1997-2010) 
Father Patrick Cecil (2010-2016) 
Father Rich Jakubik (2020–present)

References

External links 

Roman Catholic churches in Chicago